Philygria is a genus of shore flies (insects in the family Ephydridae).

Species
These 44 species belong to the genus Philygria:

P. albidipennis (Stenhammar, 1844)
P. argentinae Hollmann-Schirrmacher, 1998 c g
P. brincki Wirth, 1960 c g
P. cedercreutzi Frey, 1945 c g
P. chaci Hollmann-Schirrmacher, 1998 c g
P. costalis (Canzoneri & Meneghini, 1969) c g
P. debilis Loew, 1861 i c g b
P. dimidiata (Sturtevant and Wheeler, 1954) i c g
P. etzeli Hollmann-Schirrmacher, 1998 c g
P. flavipes (Fallén, 1823) c g
P. flavitarsis Miyagi, 1977 c g
P. galapagensis Wirth, 1969 c g
P. gesae Hollmann-Schirrmacher, 1998 c g
P. helmuti Hollmann-Schirrmacher, 1998 c g
P. inpunctata (Becker, 1926) c g
P. interrupta (Haliday, 1833) c g
P. interstincta (Fallén, 1813) c g
P. longipennis (Hendel, 1930) c g
P. mackieae (Cresson, 1943) c g
P. maculipennis (Robineau-Desvoidy, 1830) c g
P. madeirae Hollmann-Schirrmacher, 1998 c g
P. minima (Canzoneri & Meneghini, 1969) c
P. miyagii Hollmann-Schirrmacher, 1998 c g
P. mocsaryi Kertész, 1910 c g
P. morans (Cresson, 1930) c g
P. nepalensis (Dahl, 1968) c g
P. nigrescens (Cresson, 1930) i c g b
P. nigricauda (Stenhammar, 1844)
P. nitifrons (Williston, 1896) c g
P. nubeculosa Strobl, 1909 c g
P. obtecta Becker, 1896 c g
P. olololosensis Canzoneri & Meneghini, 1985 c g
P. ololosensis Canzoneri & Meneghini, 1985 c g
P. opposita Loew, 1861 i c g
P. pallipes (Meigen, 1838) c g
P. pappi Hollmann-Schirrmacher, 1998 c g
P. posticata (Meigen, 1830) c g
P. punctatonervosa (Fallén, 1813) c g
P. stenoptera Hollmann-Schirrmacher, 1998 c g
P. stictica (Meigen, 1830) c g
P. takagii Miyagi, 1977 c g
P. tirolis (Cresson, 1930) c g
P. trilineata Meijere, 1907 c g
P. vittipennis (Zetterstedt, 1838) c g

Data sources: i = ITIS, c = Catalogue of Life, g = GBIF, b = Bugguide.net

References

Further reading

 

Ephydridae
Articles created by Qbugbot
Ephydroidea genera